Atsuko Baba (born 13 June 1995) is a Japanese female handball player for Hokkoku Bank and the Japanese national team.

She represented Japan at the 2021 World Women's Handball Championship in Spain.

References

1995 births
Living people
Japanese female handball players
20th-century Japanese women
21st-century Japanese women